Cirebonese mask dance is a local indigenous art form of Cirebon in Java, including Indramayu and Jatibarang, West Java and Brebes, Central Java. It is called mask dance because the dancers use masks when dancing. There is a lot of variety in Javanese mask dance, both in terms of the dance style and the stories to be conveyed. Sometimes the mask dance can be performed by solo dancers, or it can also be performed by several people. Tari topeng cirebon comprised Panji, Samba, Rumyang, Tumenggung and Kelana. Each mask represents different meanings. Panji represents holiness like a new born person. Samba represents a child and excitement. Rumyang represents a teenager and life. Tumenggung represents a wise person and loyalty. And last Kelana represents emotions, anger and hatred. All these meanings influence the dance movements. Panji has slow and soft dance movements, while Samba has fast dance movements.

Graceful hand and body movements, and musical accompaniment dominated by drums and fiddle, are hallmarks of Javanese mask dance.
The dance is performed on special occasions for local officials, or for other traditional celebrations.

Gallery

See also

Betawi mask dance
Banjar mask dance
Ireng mask dance
Topeng dance
Dance in Indonesia

References

Dances of Java
Theatre in Indonesia
Traditional drama and theatre of Indonesia
Masquerade ceremonies in Asia
Masked dances